The Cowardly Way is a lost 1915 silent film drama directed by John Ince and starring Florence Reed.

Plot

Cast
Florence Reed - Eunice Fielding
Isabel MacGregor - Marjorie Harcourt
Maude Hill - Nance St. Germain
Bennett Southard - Hack Harcourt
Ferdinand Tidmarsh - Bob Fisher

References

External links

1915 films
American silent feature films
Films directed by John Ince
American black-and-white films
Silent American drama films
1915 drama films
Lost American films
World Film Company films
1915 lost films
Lost drama films
1910s American films